Mae Ai is the northernmost district (amphoe) of Chiang Mai province, northern Thailand.

History
The minor district (king amphoe) Mae Ai was created on 15 August 1967, when the three tambons Mae Ai, Mae Sao, and Mae Na Wang were separated from Fang district. It was upgraded to a full district on 28 June 1973.

Geography
Neighboring districts are (from the southwest clockwise) Fang of Chiang Mai Province, Shan State of Myanmar, Mae Fa Luang, Mueang Chiang Rai, and Mae Suai of Chiang Rai province.

The important rivers are the Kok and Fang Rivers.

Administration

Central administration 
Mae Ai is divided into seven sub-districts (tambons), which are further divided into 93 administrative villages (mubans).

Local administration 
There is one sub-district municipality (thesaban tambon) in the district:
 Mae Ai consisting of parts of the sub-districts Mae Ai, Malika.

There are six sub-district administrative organizations (SAO) in the district:
 Doi Lang consisting of parts of sub-districts Mae Ai and Malika.
 Mae Sao consisting of sub-district Mae Sao.
 San Ton Mue consisting of sub-district San Ton Mue.
 Mae Na Wang consisting of sub-district Mae Na Wang.
 Tha Ton consisting of sub-district Tha Ton.
 Ban Luang consisting of the sub-district Ban Luang.

References

External links
amphoe.com

Mae Ai